Carole Kay Hillard (née Rypkema; August 14, 1936 – October 25, 2007) was the first woman to serve as Lieutenant Governor of South Dakota.

Personal
Hillard was born in Deadwood, South Dakota, August 14, 1936 to Edward Rypkema and Vernell Peterson; she was one of three daughters born to them. She graduated from the University of Arizona in 1957 with an undergraduate degree. She subsequently earned a master's degree in education from South Dakota State University in 1982 and then a master's degree in political science at the University of South Dakota in 1984.

Hillard was married to John Hillard. They had five children.

Politics
Hillard's electoral career began when she served on the Rapid City Common Council. She was then elected to two terms in the South Dakota House of Representatives from Rapid City.

Hillard, a Republican, was elected as Lieutenant Governor in 1994 and was re-elected in 1998 as the running mate of Bill Janklow; she served from 1995 to 2003. She was instrumental in the foundation of the Rapid City woman's shelter and the Cornerstone Rescue Mission and was inducted into the South Dakota Hall of Fame in 2007. In 1996, incumbent Democratic U.S. Congressman Tim Johnson of South Dakota's At-large congressional district decided to retire to run for the U.S. Senate. Hillard decided to run for the open seat, and lost to John Thune, 59%-41% in the Republican primary.

Death
Hillard suffered a spinal fracture and three broken ribs on October 8, 2007 while sailing on a boat with friends in the Adriatic Sea. She underwent surgery in Zagreb, Croatia two days later.

On October 19, 2007, she was hospitalized while in Switzerland before she was bound to return home to the United States. She had developed pneumonia, a bacterial blood infection and suffered a series of strokes. Hillard died at University Hospital in Lausanne on October 25, 2007, at age 71.

See also
List of female lieutenant governors in the United States

References

External links
Obituary from the Rapid City Journal
Carole Hillard, South Dakota Magazine

1936 births
2007 deaths
2000 United States presidential electors
20th-century American politicians
20th-century American women politicians
21st-century American politicians
21st-century American women politicians
Infectious disease deaths in Switzerland
Lieutenant Governors of South Dakota
Republican Party members of the South Dakota House of Representatives
People from Deadwood, South Dakota
Politicians from Rapid City, South Dakota
South Dakota State University alumni
South Dakota city council members
University of Arizona alumni
University of South Dakota alumni
Women city councillors in South Dakota
Women state legislators in South Dakota